James Terry Conway (born December 26, 1947) is a retired United States Marine Corps four-star general who served as the 34th Commandant of the Marine Corps. Among his previous postings were Director of Operations (J-3) on the Joint Chiefs of Staff, Commanding General of 1st Marine Division and I Marine Expeditionary Force, taking part in the 2003 invasion of Iraq and the First Battle of Fallujah.

Early life
Conway was born in Walnut Ridge, Arkansas. He graduated from Roosevelt High School in St. Louis, Missouri and then attended Southeast Missouri State University, where he was a member of the Sigma Phi Epsilon fraternity, graduating in 1969 with a Bachelor of Science degree in psychology. He was commissioned as an infantry officer in 1970.

Marine career
Conway's first assignment was command of a rifle platoon with 3rd Battalion 1st Marines, based at Camp Pendleton. He also served as the battalion's 106mm recoilless rifle platoon commander. Later, he served as Marine detachment executive officer aboard the aircraft carrier  and as commanding officer of the Sea School at Marine Corps Recruit Depot San Diego.

After graduating with honors from the Army's Infantry Officers Advanced Course, Conway commanded two companies in the 2nd Marine Regiment's Operations and Security section. As a field grade officer, he commanded two companies of students and taught tactics at The Basic School. He then went on to serve as operations officer for the 31st Marine Amphibious Unit, with sea duty in the western Pacific and in contingency operations off Beirut, Lebanon.

Returning to the United States, Conway was assigned as Senior Aide to the Chairman of the Joint Chiefs of Staff for two years. After graduating from Marine Corps Command and Staff College with honors, he took command of 3rd Battalion 2nd Marines through its eight-month deployment to Southwest Asia during the Gulf War.

After the war, he was promoted to colonel and assigned command of The Basic School. Promoted to brigadier general in December 1995, he again was assigned to the Joint Chiefs and later served as president of the Marine Corps University. After being promoted to major general, he served as commander of the 1st Marine Division and as Deputy Commanding General of Marine Forces Central. He was promoted to lieutenant general and assumed command of I Marine Expeditionary Force (I MEF) on November 16, 2002. He commanded I MEF during two combat tours in Iraq, with 60,000 troops under his command, including Marines, soldiers, sailors, and British forces. In the book The Iraq War, Conway was described as, "big, buff, well read and well educated ... he represented all that was best about the new United States Marine Corps, which General Al Gray as the commandant had set up."

In a press interview on May 30, 2003, Conway was questioned about the failure at that point to locate weapons of mass destruction in Iraq. He replied, in part:

US Marines of the 1st Marine Expeditionary Force under Conway's command constructed the military base "Camp Alpha" on top of ancient Babylonian ruins following the invasion. Though a US Military spokesman claimed that the project was discussed with the "head of the Babylon museum", the construction of the base drew intense criticism from archaeologists, who contend that it caused irreparable damage to one of the most important sites in the world. Dr. John Curtis of the British Museum's Near East department described how parts of the archaeological site were levelled and paved over to create a helipad as well as parking lots for heavy vehicles. Donny George, head of the Iraqi State Board for Heritage and Antiquities, stated that the "mess will take decades to sort out".

On June 13, 2006, Conway was nominated by President George W. Bush to become the 34th Commandant of the Marine Corps; the nomination was confirmed by the Senate on August 2, 2006. On November 13, Conway was promoted to the rank of general at Marine Barracks, Washington, D.C. and became the 34th Commandant of the Marine Corps. He was the first Commandant in nearly 40 years to have not served in the Vietnam War.

On June 11, 2009, Conway spoke at the National Press Club about the importance of maintaining the Amphibious assault ships to lift two Marine Expeditionary Brigades and the time "at home" away from the current wars to train for amphibious assault.

Conway was reported to have had "major reservations" about the repeal of "don't ask, don't tell", in contrast to the Pentagon opinion that the younger rank and file of the military did not have such reservations about serving with openly gay service members. Conway, along with Chief of Naval Operations, Admiral Gary Roughead, and Chief of Staff of the United States Army, General George Casey, supported running a one-year study on the effects of a possible repeal. Conway said that if gay Marines are allowed to serve openly, he might need to change the policy that requires unmarried Marines to share rooms. The policy was repealed on December 22, 2010, after his tenure as Commandant had ended.

On October 22, 2010, Conway turned the position of Commandant over to General James F. Amos, his Assistant Commandant, at a ceremony at Marine Barracks, Washington, D.C., Defense secretary Robert Gates presented Conway with his third Defense Distinguished Service Medal during the change-in-command. He then retired on November 1.

Personal life
Conway is a graduate of the Infantry Officers Advanced Course, the Marine Corps Command and Staff College, and the Air War College.

Awards and decorations
Conway has been decorated for service, to include: 
 

He also holds 7 expert awards in both rifle and pistol marksmanship badges. In 2010, Conway was the recipient of the distinguished "Keeper of the Flame" award.

See also
List of United States Marine Corps four-star generals
United States Marine Corps Wounded Warrior Regiment

Notes

References

External links

1947 births
Living people
United States Marine Corps personnel of the Gulf War
United States Marine Corps personnel of the Iraq War
People from Walnut Ridge, Arkansas
Recipients of the Legion of Merit
United States Marine Corps generals
Joint Chiefs of Staff
United States Marine Corps Commandants
Commandeurs of the Légion d'honneur
Recipients of the Defense Distinguished Service Medal
Recipients of the Navy Distinguished Service Medal